The Odalisque is a painting by Marià Fortuny exhibited at the National Art Museum of Catalonia in Barcelona.

References

Further reading 
Doñate, Mercè; Mendoza, Cristina; Quílez, Francesc Maria: Fortuny. MNAC. 2004.

External links 
 The artwork at Museum's website

Paintings by Marià Fortuny
Paintings in the collection of the Museu Nacional d'Art de Catalunya
1861 paintings
Nude art